is a Japanese singer, dancer, and choreographer, currently based in China. He is a member of the international boy group Into1 after finishing third place in the Chinese survival competition show Produce Camp 2021. He is also the leader of Japanese-Chinese boy group WARPS UP.

Early life and family 
Rikimaru Chikada was born on 2 November 1993 in Hyōgo, Japan. His mother is a jazz dancer and runs a dance studio. His father is a professional baseball player and coach. His younger sister, Yumeri Chikada, is also a dancer and choreographer. He attended high school at Itami Kita High School and graduated from Kyoto University of Foreign Studies, majoring in Portuguese (Department of Brazilian and Portuguese Studies).

Rikimaru started dancing at the age of 4, started teaching dance at the age of 13, and became a choreographer at the age of 19. Rikimaru's commercial choreography debut is BoA's LookBook Dance Break in 2015. .

Career

1997–2011: Career beginnings 
Rikimaru started learning dance at age 4. At age 9, he and his mother appeared and danced in the Japanese variety show named "Gakkō e Ikō". In 2007, Rikimaru and his sister Yumeri formed the dance group named Respect. From 2007 to 2008, Respect participated in many dance competitions in Japan and won awards such as 4th Dance Olympics Champion, MOVE MIX BEST G Class Champion, 9th COMBOX Champion, National Super Kids Dance Contest Kyushu Tournament Champion, 2nd K-palette cup Runner-up, Dance Attack Tokyo Tournament Runner-up, Shikoku Tournament Special prize, Kobe Rokko Island 1st Dance Championship Special prize, etc...

In addition, Rikimaru also won some individual awards including KIDS MIX 2007 Best Dancer Award and ALL KANKUU Dance Contest Excellent Performance Award 2007.

2012–2020: International exchanges and WARPs UP 
From 2012 to 2015, Rikimaru went to Los Angeles (USA) to learn choreography, choreographing skills and interact with many dancers. During his time in LA, he joined ImmaBEAST, an America's champion teen dance group, one of the top hip-hop dance groups in the USA.

He began choreographing at 19, working on the team of renowned choreographer Rino Nakasone before earning his first credit on a project with BoA's "Look Book". He has choreographed for many artists such as BoA, SHINee, Taemin, Red Velvet, NCT127, etc.

In 2016, Rikimaru was invited to be a judge of the Dance Vision contest in China. In 2018, Rikimaru and his sister Yumeri led the team and won Dance Vision Vol. 6. In the same year, his choreography won the runner-up award of the World Of Dance Junior (Osaka Station). From 2016 to 2018, Rikimaru was a dance choreographer and special guest coach at dance studio “1M Studio Dance” in Korea.

In 2019, he made his debut as the leader of Japanese-Chinese boy group WARPs Up, under the Avex Trax record label.  He also choreographed the group's dances.

2021–present: Produce Camp 2021 and INTO1 
In 2021, Rikimaru, as an Avex Trax trainee, participated in Produce Camp 2021 , a reality competetition show to create an international boy band formation produced by Tencent Video. He stayed within the top ranks  from the beginning to the end of the show. On 24 April 2021, Rikimaru ranked third during the final episode with 16,591,943 votes, securing him a spot as an official member of the project boy group INTO1.

In August 2021, Rikimaru was hospitalized due to a back injury, he took a hiatus from promtional activities while he recovers. </ref> During his hiatus he returned to Japan. In May 2022, Rikimaru returned to his activities in INTO1. </ref>

Endorsements
Alongside Mika's activities with Into1, he has become a brand ambassador and spokesperson for some brands. He has also featured on the cover of many magazines such as Yizhou Magazine, RAYLI, Purple Pearl and more.

Discography

Singles

Production Credits

Notable Choreography

Personal Works

Collaborative choreographies

Filmography

Television Series

Music Video Appearances

External links 
 
 Rikimaru Chikada trên Sina Weibo

References 

Mandopop singers
Japanese choreographers
Japanese male dancers
Japanese male singers
Articles containing Japanese-language text
1993 births
Into1 members
Reality show winners
Living people
Produce 101 (Chinese TV series) contestants